West Hollywood is a city in Los Angeles County, California, United States. Incorporated in 1984, it is home to the Sunset Strip. As of the 2020 U.S. Census, its population was 35,757. It is considered one of the most prominent gay villages in the United States.

History

Most historical writings about West Hollywood begin in the late-18th century with European colonization when the Portuguese explorer João Rodrigues Cabrilho arrived offshore and claimed the already inhabited region for Spain. Around 5,000 of the indigenous inhabitants from the Tongva Indian tribe canoed out to greet the ship. The Tongva tribe was a nation of hunter-gatherers known for their reverence for dance and courage. By 1771, these native people had been severely ravaged by the diseases brought in by the Europeans from across wide oceans. The Spanish mission system changed the tribal name to "Gabrielinos", in reference to the Mission de San Gabriel. Early in 1770 Gaspar de Portola's Mexican expeditionary force stopped just south of the Santa Monica Mountains near what would become West Hollywood to draw pitch (brea in Spanish) from tar pits to waterproof their belongings and to say Mass. The Gabrielinos are believed to have burned the pitch for fuel.

By 1780, what became the "Sunset Strip" was the major connecting road for El Pueblo de Los Angeles, and all ranches westward to the Pacific Ocean. This land passed through the hands of various owners during the next one hundred years, and it was called names such as "La Brea" and "Plummer" that are listed in historical records.  Most of this area was part of the Rancho La Brea, and eventually it came to be owned by the Henry Hancock family.

During the final decade years of the nineteenth century, the first large land reconstruction of the town of "Sherman" significantly accelerated the development of the region. In what would later become West Hollywood—the town of "Sherman"—was established by Moses Sherman and his partners of the Los Angeles Pacific Railroad, an interurban railroad line which later became part of the Pacific Electric Railway system. Sherman became the location of the railroad's main shops, railroad yards, and "car barns". Many working-class employees of the railroad settled in this town. It was during this time that the city began to earn its reputation as a loosely regulated, liquor-friendly (during Prohibition) place for eccentric people wary of government interference. Despite several annexation attempts, the town elected not to become part of the City of Los Angeles. In a controversial decision, in 1925 Sherman adopted "West Hollywood", "...a moniker pioneered earlier in the decade by the West Hollywood Realty Board" as its informal name, though it remained under the governance of Los Angeles County.

For many decades, the area that is now the city of West Hollywood was an unincorporated area in the midst of Los Angeles. Because gambling was illegal in the city of Los Angeles, but still legal in Los Angeles County, the 1920s saw the proliferation of many casinos, night clubs, etc., along Sunset Boulevard (which starts near downtown Los Angeles and runs westward). These businesses were immune from the sometimes heavy-handed law-enforcement of the L.A. Police Department.

Some people connected with movie-making were attracted to this less-restricted area of the County, and a number of architecturally distinctive apartment buildings and hotels were built. Many interior designers, decorators and "to the trade" furnishing showrooms located in West Hollywood date back to the middle of the century.

Eventually, the area and its extravagant nightclubs fell out of favor. However, the Sunset Strip and its restaurants, saloons, and nightclubs continued to be an attraction for out-of-town tourists. During the late 1960s, the Sunset Strip was transformed again during the hippie movement which brought a thriving music publishing industry coupled with the "hippie" culture. Some young people from all over the country flocked to West Hollywood.

The most recent migration to West Hollywood came about after the dissolution of the Soviet Union, when thousands of Russian Jews immigrated to the city. A majority of the 5,000 to 6,000 Russian Jews settled in two major immigration waves, 1978–79 and 1988–92. Other than New York, West Hollywood's Russian-speaking community is the most concentrated single Russian-speaking region in United States.

The Gauntlet was a body piercing business founded by Jim Ward in West Hollywood that is considered the first business of its type in the United States and was the beginning of the body piercing industry. The Gauntlet began in November 1975, with its original location in Ward's West Hollywood home, but on the evening of Friday, November 17, 1978, it celebrated the grand opening of its first commercial location at 8720 Santa Monica Boulevard (also in West Hollywood).

Due to the expiration of rent control protections in L.A., a coalition of gay men, Russian Jews, and the elderly successfully held a vote to officially incorporate the City of West Hollywood in 1984; by electing a city council with an openly gay majority and immediately passing a series of rent control measures to protect its longtime citizens. West Hollywood then immediately adopted one of the strongest rent control laws in the nation.

The city of West Hollywood gave the keys to the city to Stormy Daniels on "Stormy Daniels Day", May 23, 2018.

Geography
West Hollywood is bounded by the city of Beverly Hills on the west, and by neighborhoods of the city of Los Angeles: Hollywood Hills on the north, Hollywood on the east, the Fairfax District on the southeast, and Beverly Grove on the southwest. The city's irregular boundary is featured in its logo; it was largely formed from the unincorporated Los Angeles County area which had not become part of the surrounding cities.

West Hollywood benefits from a very dense, compact urban form with small lots, mixed land use, and a walkable street grid. According to Walkscore, a website that ranks cities based on walkability, West Hollywood is the most walkable city in California with a Walkscore of 89. Commercial corridors include the nightlife and dining focused on the Sunset Strip, along Santa Monica Boulevard, and the Avenues of Art and Design along Robertson, Melrose, and Beverly Boulevard.

Residential neighborhoods in West Hollywood include the Norma Triangle, West Hollywood North, West Hollywood West, West Hollywood East, and West Hollywood Heights, all of which are only a few blocks long or wide. Major intersecting streets typically provide amenities within walking distance of adjacent neighborhoods.

Climate
West Hollywood has a subtropical-semi-arid climate with year-round warm weather, although winter nights are cool. The record high temperature of 111 °F was recorded on September 26, 1963, while the record low of 24 °F was recorded on January 4, 1949.  Rainfall is sparse (only 13 inches annually), and falls mainly during the winter months. Snow is extraordinarily rare in West Hollywood, with the last accumulation occurring in 1949.

Demographics

2010
The 2010 United States Census reported that West Hollywood had a population of 34,399. The racial makeup of West Hollywood was 28,979 (84.2%) White (77.9% Non-Hispanic White), 1,115 (3.2%) African American, 103 (0.3%) Native American, 1,874 (5.4%) Asian, 34 (0.1%) Pacific Islander, 1,049 (3.0%) from other races, and 1,245 (3.6%) from two or more races. Hispanic or Latino of any race were 3,613 persons (10.5%).

The census reported that 34,290 people (99.7% of the population) lived in households, 109 (0.3%) lived in non-institutionalized group quarters, and 0 (0%) were institutionalized.

There were 22,511 households, out of which 1,141 (5.1%) had children under the age of 18 living in them, 3,060 (13.6%) were opposite-sex married couples living together, 852 (3.8%) had a female householder with no husband present, 431 (1.9%) had a male householder with no wife present.  There were 1,094 (4.9%) unmarried opposite-sex partnerships, and 1,321 (5.9%) same-sex married couples or partnerships. 13,434 households (59.7%) were made up of individuals, and 2,606 (11.6%) had someone living alone who was 65 years of age or older. The average household size was 1.52.  There were 4,343 families (19.3% of all households); the average family size was 2.42.

The population was spread out, with 1,578 people (4.6%) under the age of 18, 2,407 people (7.0%) aged 18 to 24, 16,228 people (47.2%) aged 25 to 44, 9,061 people (26.3%) aged 45 to 64, and 5,125 people (14.9%) who were 65 years of age or older.  The median age was 40.4 years. For every 100 females, there were 128.4 males.  For every 100 females aged 18 and over, there were 129.9 males.

The homeowner vacancy rate was 3.6%; the rental vacancy rate was 5.9%.  7,874 people (22.9% of the population) lived in owner-occupied housing units and 26,416 people (76.8%) lived in rental housing units.

During 2009–2013, West Hollywood had a median household income of $52,649, with 15.8% of the population living below the federal poverty line.

, gay men were 33% of the city's population; a 2013 survey had estimated the gay male population at 39%.

2000
As of the census of 2000, there were 35,716 people, 23,120 households, and 5,202 families residing in the city. The population density was 18,992.7 inhabitants per square mile (7,335.1/km). The racial makeup of the city was 86.4% White, 6.4% African American, 3.8% Asian, 0.4% Native American, 0.1% Pacific Islander, 2.9% from other races, and 3.4% from two or more races. Hispanic or Latino of any race were 8.8% of the population.

There were 23,120 households, out of which 5.8% had children under the age of eighteen, 16.4% were married couples living together, 4.4% had a female householder with no husband present, and 77.5% were non-families. 60.5% of all households were made up of individuals, and 12.0% included someone living alone who was 65 years of age or older.  The average household size was 1.53, and the average family size was 2.50.

In the city, the population was spread out, with 5.7% under the age of 18, 6.3% from 18 to 24, 48.6% from 25 to 44, 22.3% from 45 to 64, and 17.0% who were 65 years of age or older.  The median age was 39 years. For every 100 females, there were 123.4 males.  For every 100 females aged eighteen and older, there were 125.2 males.

The median income for a household in the city was $38,914, and the median income for a family was $41,463. Males had a median income of $45,598 versus $35,750 for females. The per capita income for the city was $38,302.  About 7.3% of families and 11.5% of the population were below the poverty line, including 10.0% of those under age 18 and 10.5% of those age 65 or over.

Economy

Top employers
According to the City's 2021 Comprehensive Annual Financial Report, the top employers in the city were:

Cannabis

Under the legalization of the sale and distribution of cannabis, the city plans to issue 40 licenses to either operate a dispensary, consumption lounge or delivery service. Eight licenses are planned in each of the following categories:

Adult-use retail business licenses
Consumption lounge (smoking, vaping, edibles) business licenses
Consumption lounge (edibles only) business licenses
Medical-use dispensary business licenses
Business licenses for cannabis delivery services located in West Hollywood

State law does not allow local governments to regulate adults in growing, using, or transporting marijuana for personal use but commercial activities, such as growing, testing, and selling cannabis within their jurisdiction may be regulated by each city by licensing none or only some of these activities. West Hollywood's first four dispensaries, Alternative Herbal Health Services, Los Angeles Patients and Caregivers Group, Zen Healing and MedMen WeHo, were granted temporary extensions in June 2019 to operate as retail businesses through the remainder of the year.

In July 2019, the West Hollywood Business License Commission approved a cannabis consumption license for Lowell Herb Co. In September 2019, Lowell Farms: A Cannabis Cafe opened with a menu of cannabis for consumption, THC-infused drinks and meals for cannabis-enhanced sense of taste and smell. It is the first cannabis cafe in the United States and will include the expertise of cannabis sommeliers, known as "budtenders" on site.

On August 20, 2020, the Original Cannabis Cafe (previously known as The Lowell Cafe in West Hollywood) became America's first restaurant allowed to serve legal marijuana to open in California. It became one of eight establishments granted a cannabis consumption license in West Hollywood. There were reportedly over 300 applicants, and the Original Cannabis Cafe states it was granted the first license.

Arts and culture

The West Hollywood Halloween Carnival is an event that takes place annually on October 31.

Christopher Street West is an LGBT pride parade and festival that was first held in June 1970 in Hollywood to commemorate the first anniversary of the Stonewall Riots in New York.  After incorporation, the event moved to West Hollywood and is typically held the second weekend in June.

One City One Pride is an LGBT Arts Festival held during the month of June in West Hollywood.

The West Hollywood Book Fair has been held in the fall since 2001. Past participants have included Andrew McCarthy, Deepak Chopra, and Rocco DiSpirito.

The Oscars is a major event in the city with a majority of the large Academy Award party venues being located in the city. Many streets are closed and traffic swells on this day each year.

Frontrunners LGBT Pride Run is a 5 km/10 km run/walk held on the Sunday morning of LGBT Pride.

The City of West Hollywood sponsors an animal walk and pet appreciation days throughout the year, which have in the past featured pet psychics and dog activities. During Halloween the week prior to October 31, animals can participate in a costume contest in West Hollywood Park. West Hollywood is in close proximity to Runyon Canyon Park's hiking trail and dog park in Hollywood.

The Elton John AIDS Foundation Academy Awards Party has traditionally been held at the Pacific Design Center. It is a multimillion-dollar fundraiser for the foundation.

West Hollywood has many ongoing programs to celebrate the vibrant arts and unique culture of the city. The literary community is acknowledged with the year-round author series WeHo Reads, featuring new and noteworthy authors at the West Hollywood Library with a full day literary event each fall. An annual PowPow is presented by AIDS Project Los Angeles Red Circle Project and the City of West Hollywood. This event, held at Plummer Park promotes HIV awareness and prevention among the Native communities and features dance, music, food, and educational resources.

West Hollywood inaugurated the first City Poet, Steven Reigns, during the regular City Council meeting on October 6, 2014.

LGBT community

In 1984, West Hollywood became one of the first pro-gay municipality regions in the country, with traditions and their recognition of acceptance recognized by locals and visitors.

Approximately forty percent of the population identifies as lesbian, gay, bisexual or transgender, and the city has become a leader of communities in showcasing how to protect and advocate for equal rights for the LGBT community. West Hollywood has become one of the world’s top gay vacation spots for LGBT travelers and is at the center of gay California nightlife, including spas, shopping, and dining.

The city hosts expansive historical records of the LGBT community. The West Hollywood Library hosts an extensive collection of LGBT records, literature, and history, including the June L. Mazer Lesbian Archives, and the Ron Shipton HIV Information Center. According to an LA Times article, the ONE Archives Gallery and Museum is the first museum in Southern California exclusively dedicated to gay history.

In 2018, America's first city-wide Bi Pride event was held in West Hollywood.

Government

Local
The city government is headed by a five-member city council, including a mayor and a mayor pro tem who serve one-year terms. The positions of mayor and mayor pro tem are largely ceremonial positions which rotate between the council members, and both positions are largely not re-elected in concurrent terms, although council members serve multiple non-concurrent terms in both offices. Currently, the five Council Members are Mayor Sepi Shyne, Mayor Pro Tempore  John M. Erickson Councilmembers Chelsea Lee Byers, John Heilman, and Lauren Meister.

West Hollywood was the first city in the country to have a city council with a majority of gay members.

On February 19, 2001, West Hollywood became the second city in the United States (after Boulder, Colorado) to change the term pet "owner" to pet "guardian" in their municipal codes.

With West Hollywood being one of the most prominent gay-friendly cities in the United States, Proposition 8 had a higher rate of rejection than it did in any other city in Los Angeles County: 86% of the city voted against the amendment, which restricted marriage to heterosexual couples.

State and federal representation

On December 20, 2021, the California Citizens Redistricting Commission voted 14-0 in favor of a new state Assembly and Senate district maps and delivered those maps to the secretary of state on December 27, 2021. These maps take effect for California's 2022 state legislative elections, changing West Hollywood’s Assembly District to AD 51 and Senate District to SD 24.

Education

Primary and secondary schools

West Hollywood is part of the Los Angeles Unified School District. The area is within Board District 4.

Elementary schools that serve sections of West Hollywood include:
 West Hollywood Elementary School K–6
 Rosewood Avenue Elementary School K-5
 Laurel Elementary School K-8
 Melrose Elementary School K-6
 Gardner Street Elementary School K-5
(Some areas jointly zoned to Rosewood and West Hollywood)

Most of West Hollywood is zoned to Bancroft Middle School. Some portions in the south are zoned to John Burroughs Middle School.  Students living in the Los Angeles area known as Beverly Hills Post Office, usually attend West Hollywood Elementary but then go to Emerson Middle School.

Private Schools in West Hollywood:
 West Hollywood College Preparatory School (WHCP) K-12
 The Center for Early Education
 Pacific Hills School

All of West Hollywood is zoned to Fairfax High School; some areas are jointly zoned to Fairfax High School and Hollywood High School.

The Center for Early Education and Pacific Hills School are private schools in West Hollywood.

Media
 West Hollywood News
 WEHOville Blog:
 The Real Friends of WeHo

Infrastructure

Transportation
Traffic congestion, public transport and parking are critical issues in the city due to its location between access to areas such as Greater Hollywood to the east and the San Fernando Valley to the north and the area of the Los Angeles West Side, with the Hollywood Hills creating a natural impediment to the north. Santa Monica Boulevard and Sunset Boulevard are critical east-west arteries in the metropolitan area, and Laurel Canyon Boulevard is a popular shortcut through the hills. Nearly 600 employees and 260 buses in the District 7 fleet of the LACMTA are based in a large facility on prime real estate near San Vicente Boulevard and Santa Monica Boulevard. The K Line extension to the Hollywood/Highland station is likely to pass through, or along, the edge of West Hollywood.

The PickUp

In August 2013, the City of West Hollywood launched a free Friday and Saturday night shuttle, the PickUp, connecting the eastern and western parts of the city. The goal of The PickUp is to provide an alternative to the automobile and bring an energetic and playful transit option to one of West Hollywood’s busiest nighttime districts. The Public Relations Society of America Los Angeles Chapter (PRSA-LA) has recognized the City of West Hollywood with a PRism Award of Excellence in the category of New Product/Service Launch for the city’s kick-off campaign for the PickUp.

The Sunset Trip shuttle service

In June 2018, the City of West Hollywood launched a new free shuttle service called The Sunset Trip. This service focuses on shuttling riders on Sunset Boulevard, but also crosses the PickUp shuttle route to allow transfers.

Public health and safety
The Los Angeles County Sheriff's Department operates the West Hollywood Station.

The Los Angeles County Department of Health Services operates the Hollywood-Wilshire Health Center in Hollywood, serving West Hollywood.

Fire protection in West Hollywood is provided by the Los Angeles County Fire Department. LACoFD operates Station 7, the battalion headquarters, and Station 8, both in West Hollywood, as a part of Battalion 1.

Emergency Medical Services are provided by LACoFD and McCormick Ambulance.

Social services
West Hollywood, with a gay male population of about 39%, has been disproportionately affected by the HIV/AIDS epidemic which has ravaged its gay male population since the early 1980s. The city funds or subsidizes an array of services for those living with HIV or AIDS. The AIDS Healthcare Foundation parks a Mobile HIV/STD testing van outside of the city's busiest nightclubs on Friday and Saturday nights, and again on Sunday afternoons.  This outreach attempts to intervene with those young people most at-risk for HIV infection. Project Angel Food receives city funding to deliver hundreds of fresh lunches and dinners daily which are prepared under the supervision of a registered dietitian who tailors the meals to meet individual client's nutritional needs. AIDS Project Los Angeles (APLA) is a national leader for AIDS policy and advocacy issues and provides assistance to clients navigating the maze of available public benefits.  APLA also provides free dental, psychotherapy and pharmaceutical services. Aid for AIDS provides direct financial support by assisting clients with rent, utility and pharmacy expenses.  The city also subsidizes agencies that help clients train for a return to the workforce. The city permits all residents living with HIV/AIDS to have up to two pets in his or her home regardless of a landlord's specifications in the property's lease.

West Hollywood subsidizes programs for its growing population of children through a partnership with the USDA and local schools.  "Healthy Start West Hollywood" is a program of the city's Social Services division that introduces pre-Kindergarten through High School age kids to the benefits of good nutrition through such activities as collective vegetable gardens and yoga.

The special needs of senior citizens are addressed through a variety of programs.  West Hollywood either funds or subsidizes agencies that offer adult day care, a roommate matching service, and nutritious meals.  The West Hollywood Senior Center provides recreational programs, excursions, and socializing as well as counseling and case management.

West Hollywood also seeks to address the health needs of residents who do not have adequate insurance by subsidizing the LA Free Clinic and The Los Angeles Gay and Lesbian Center.  Residents can access free medical, dental, legal and mental health services between these two sites.

The West Hollywood's Public Safety Division publishes guides on sexual assault prevention, nightclub safety, and how to access rape services.

Public library

County of Los Angeles Public Library operates the West Hollywood Library at 625 North San Vicente Boulevard.

Until early September 2011, the library was based at 715 North San Vicente Boulevard in a building designed by architect Edward H. Fickett. On September 6, 2011, the City of West Hollywood demolished that building, which aroused controversy among some community members, including the architect's wife.

The current library building officially opened to the public on October 1, 2011. The building, which was designed by architects Steve Johnson and James Favaro, received a favorable review in the Los Angeles Times that ended by calling it "...a tremendously encouraging achievement". Exterior surfaces of the library building and adjacent parking structure are decorated with murals by Shepard Fairey, Kenny Scharf and Marquis Lewis (aka Retna), and the interior incorporates design work by Fairey and David Wiseman.

Notable people
The issue of Paparazzi chasing celebrities is raised regularly and the city participates in meetings with other nearby municipalities such as Beverly Hills and Los Angeles to discuss the problem and possible actions to better control the activity. The epicenter of the Thirty Mile Zone lies just blocks to the south of the city, and is the basis for the name of TMZ on TV, a paparazzi footage-based program. TMZ moved their operations from Sunset and Crescent Heights Boulevards to Los Angeles.

On May 28, 2018, Mayor John Duran announced that Stormy Daniels would receive the "Key to the City" alongside her attorney, Michael Avenatti. “In these politically tumultuous times, Stormy Daniels has proven herself to be a profile in courage by speaking truth to power even under threats to her safety and extreme intimidation from the current Administration”, said the mayor.

Actress Drew Barrymore grew up on Poinsettia Place until the age of 7, when she moved to Sherman Oaks; she moved back to West Hollywood at the age of 14.

Mayors of West Hollywood

 Valerie Terrigno (1984–1985)
 John Heilman (1985–1986)
 Stephen Shulte (1986–1987)
 Alan Viterbi (1987–1988)
 Helen Albert (1988–1989)
 Abbe Land (1989–1990)
 John Heilman (1990–1991)
 Paul Koretz (1991–1992)
 Babette Lang (1992–1993)
 Sal Guarriello (1993–1994)
 Abbe Land (1994–1995)
 John Heilman (1995–1996)
 Paul Koretz (1996–1997)
 Sal Guarriello (1997–1998)
 Steve Martin (1998–1999)
 John Heilman (1999–2000)
 Jeff Prang (2000–2001)
 John Heilman (2001–2002)
 Sal Guarriello (2002–2003)
 Jeff Prang (2003–2004)
 John Duran (2004–2005)
 Abbe Land (2005–2006)
 John Heilman (2006–2007)
 John Duran (2007–2008)
 Jeff Prang (2008–2009)
 Abbe Land (2009–2010)
 John Heilman (2010–2011)
 John Duran (2011–2012)
 Jeff Prang (2012–2013)
 Abbe Land (2013–2014)
 John D'Amico (2014–2015)
 Lindsey P. Horvath (2015–2016)
 Lauren Meister (2016–2017)
 John Heilman (2017–2018)
 John Duran (2018–2019)
 John D'Amico (2019–2020)
 Lindsey P. Horvath (2020–2021)
 Lauren Meister (2021–present)

Landmarks and distinctive places
Alta Loma Road is home to the Sunset Marquis Hotel with its famous 45-person Whisky Bar and NightBird Recording Studios, an underground music production facility. Alta Loma Road was one of the main locations for the film Perfect. Actor Sal Mineo lived on Holloway Drive in the 1970s; he was murdered in his carport just around the corner from Alta Loma.

The western stretch of Melrose Avenue, between Fairfax Avenue and Doheny Drive, is notable for its trendy clothing boutiques, interior design shops, restaurants and antique stores. The west end of Melrose Avenue, near the Pacific Design Center, is especially known for its exclusive furniture.

The area around Fountain Avenue, Harper Avenue and Havenhurst Drive contains a high concentration of landmark 1920s Spanish Revival and Art Deco apartment buildings by such noted architects as Leland Bryant. This historic district has been home to many celebrities and at one time the Sunset Tower at 8358 Sunset Boulevard was home to Frank Sinatra, Errol Flynn, the Gabor sisters, John Wayne and Howard Hughes.

Notable business and attractions in West Hollywood include:
 The Sunset Strip
 Hotels such as Andaz West Hollywood, Chamberlain West Hollywood Hotel, The Charlie, Mondrian, Montrose West Hollywood and the Standard
 The Pacific Design Center
 Architecture such as The Schindler House by architect Rudolf Schindler
 Buildings such as 9200 Sunset by architect Charles Luckman and the old Coronet Building (Piazza del Sol)
 Music venues such as House of Blues (Closed), Whisky a Go Go, The Troubadour, The Roxy Theatre and Viper Room
 Westlake Recording Studios, where Michael Jackson recorded the albums Thriller and Bad in 1982 and 1987, respectively
 Celebrity hangouts such as Soho House, Formosa Cafe (reopened 2019), Whisky Bar, Rainbow Bar and Grill, Palm Restaurant (now located in Beverly Hills): West Hollywood (not to be confused with the chain by the same name,) Dan Tana’s, The Abbey Food & Bar and Villa Nightclub
 Film, television and music production including Samuel Goldwyn Studio (now known as The Lot), home to Oprah Winfrey Network, Funny or Die, and Showtime
 Several parks including historic Plummer Park
 Comedy Store
 Sierra Towers, the tallest residential building in the greater Los Angeles area
 Saint Victor Catholic Church
 West Hollywood Gateway Project, the city's largest shopping center that is home to Los Angeles' largest public art piece using projection technology.
Bodhi Tree Bookstore, an independent bookstore founded in 1970 that was located on Melrose Avenue.

Controversies

Discrimination issues
Sometime in the 1940s, a sign appeared over the bar at Barney's Beanery that said "FAGOTS  – STAY OUT." The message so offended locals that Life magazine did an article on opposition to the sign in 1964, which included a photograph of the owner steadfastly holding on to it. The owner died in 1968, and efforts continued to have the sign removed. The Gay Liberation Front organized a zap of the restaurant on February 7, 1970, to push for its removal. The sign disappeared that day. The sign was put up and taken down several times over the next 14 years, but the practice ended in December 1984, days after the city voted itself into existence. The then-mayor, Valerie Terrigno, the entire city council and gay-rights activists marched into Barney's and relieved the wall of the offending sign. It was held by Morris Kight for many years and now rests in the ONE National Gay & Lesbian Archives.

Jewel-Thais Williams, who owned the bar Jewel's Catch One, originally opened the bar in 1973 because she experienced discrimination in both heterosexual bars and gay bars because she was both black and a woman.

A resident drew national attention during the 2008 presidential campaign by including a Sarah Palin mannequin hung in effigy in a Halloween display. The home's decorations also featured a doll of John McCain surrounded by decorative flames in the chimney. Some residents complained about the display as a hate crime, but the Los Angeles County Sheriff's Department concluded the display did not violate any laws.

In March 2006, agents from Immigration and Customs Enforcement and the U.S. Secret Service seized 250 fake denomination notes, each bearing a denomination of $1 billion, from a West Hollywood apartment.

Celebrity controversies

In 1961, comedian Lenny Bruce was arrested on obscenity charges at The Troubadour in then-unincorporated West Hollywood. The arresting officer was a young deputy named Sherman Block, who would later become the sheriff of Los Angeles County.

In 1982, John Belushi died of a drug overdose at the Chateau Marmont hotel in Hollywood, adjacent to WeHo. On the night of his death, he was visited separately by friends Robin Williams (at the height of his own drug exploits) and Robert De Niro, each of whom left the premises, leaving Belushi in the company of assorted others, including Cathy Smith.  This is just one of many notable sordid events at the location. A 1930s movie executive reportedly said, "If you must get into trouble, do it at the Chateau Marmont".

In 1989, actor Christian Slater was arrested in West Hollywood for leading the police on a drunken car chase that ended when Slater crashed his car into a telephone pole.

On Halloween night in 1993, actor River Phoenix died at age 23 of a drug overdose at the Viper Room, a club that was opened that year and was partly owned by actor Johnny Depp until 2004.

On January 8, 2006, New Zealand film director Lee Tamahori, dressed as a woman, was arrested for allegedly offering an undercover police officer oral sex on the corner of Santa Monica Boulevard and Lodi Place. He was convicted only of criminal trespass, having pleaded no contest in exchange for other charges being dropped.

On November 17, 2006, during a performance at the Laugh Factory, a cell phone video captured Michael Richards shouting "Shut up" to a heckler in the audience, followed by repeated shouts of "He's a nigger!" to the rest of the audience (using the word six times altogether), and also making a reference to lynching.

Legislation
In 1985, West Hollywood was the first city to create a same-gender domestic partnership registration for its residents, as well as to offer same-gender domestic partner benefits for city employees. West Hollywood's comprehensive Domestic Partnership Ordinance allows those couples that are prohibited from marrying (same-sex) and those who can marry but choose not to (heterosexual), to register their union with the city. These unions are treated on an equal basis with legal marriages with respect to city-level benefits and services. In California as a whole, same-sex couples may enter domestic partnerships which offer them all of the state rights of marriage.

West Hollywood has inclusionary zoning laws governing development. The city established the Affordable Housing Trust Fund in 1986 requiring developers to either provide affordable housing in new projects or pay a fee in-lieu to the city which it directs towards other affordable housing projects.

In 1993 the West Hollywood City Council voted for West Hollywood to become the first official pro-choice city in America.

In 2006, the City Council passed a medicinal marijuana resolution, by a vote of 4–0, making it the first city in Southern California to adopt a lowest law enforcement priority law for cannabis offenses. The resolution stated, "it is not the policy of the City or its law enforcement agency to target possession of small amounts of cannabis and the consumption of non-medical cannabis in private by adults".

West Hollywood adopted one of the nation's first mandatory green building ordinances on October 1, 2007.

The city designed a law that pets are to be called "companions" and their owners "guardians" and was the first city in the country to outlaw the de-clawing of cats. In 2011, West Hollywood became the first city in the United States to ban the sale of clothing with real animal fur; the ban took effect on September 21, 2013. In May 2014, the ordinance was upheld by the U.S. District Court for the Central District of California, after a local business had challenged the prohibition as unconstitutional.

Legislation prohibiting discrimination in the workplace on the basis of sexual orientation is widely recognized as the toughest in the nation. The city is one of 225 jurisdictions in the country where it is illegal to discriminate on the basis of gender identity or expression.

City legislation bans the sale of handguns, prohibits smoking in public places, and restricts the city from doing business directly or indirectly (via vendors) with any country known to violate human rights. The city has banned the use of gas-powered leaf blowers.

See also

 D Line (Los Angeles Metro)
 ONE National Gay & Lesbian Archives
 Harold A. Henry, assured Los Angeles City Council would remain neutral in West Hollywood incorporation, 1957
 Thomas Bones (1842–1929), farmer and land developer in this area

Notes

References
 
 Kenney, Moira (2001). Mapping Gay L.A.: The Intersection of Place and Politics. Temple University Press. .
 
 Teal, Donn (1971, reissued 1995). The Gay Militants: How Gay Liberation Began in America, 1969–1971. New York, St. Martin's Press.  (1995 edition).

External links

 

 
Cities in Los Angeles County, California
Incorporated cities and towns in California
Gay villages in California
LGBT culture in Los Angeles
Jewish communities in the United States
Russian communities in the United States
Ukrainian communities in the United States
Jews and Judaism in Los Angeles
Russian-American culture in California
Former census-designated places in California
Populated places established in 1984
1984 establishments in California
Central Los Angeles
Westside (Los Angeles County)
Enclaves in the United States